Limited Editions 1990–94 is the first album release by German electronic musician Alec Empire. Released in 1994 on Mille Plateaux, it is a compilation of tracks previously issued on vinyl by that sublabel's parent, Force Inc., between 1990 and 1994.

Track listing

References

External links
 
Limited Editions 1990-94 on Bandcamp

1994 compilation albums
1994 debut albums
Alec Empire albums